The Pinnacles may refer to different geological formations:
 The Pinnacles (Atherton Tableland), Queensland, Australia
 Pinnacles National Park, California, USA
 The Pinnacles, Western Australia
 The Pinnacles, Wellington Region, New Zealand
 The Pinnacles (British Columbia)
 The Pinnacles, Dorset, England
 The Pinnacles (Montana), a mountain range in Montana
 The Pinnacles (Missouri), an area in Saline County, Missouri
 The Pinnacles (Gulf of Mexico), reefs in the Gulf of Mexico off the coasts of Mississippi and Alabama
 The Pinnacles of Mount Api in Gunung Mulu National Park, Malaysia

See also
Pinnacle (disambiguation)